The Namana is a river in Yakutia (Sakha Republic), Russia.

There are no settlements located by the river, but there is industrial production of table salt in the basin. Balagannakh village is located near the mouth of the Namana in the Lena. The river flows near a landfill where there have been leaks leading to oil pollution of its waters.

Course  
The Namanа is a left tributary of the Lena flowing through uninhabited territory. It is formed at the confluence of the Usttaakh and Orguy rivers in the Lena Plateau. It heads across the plateau through a narrow valley, meandering increasingly. After descending into the floodplain it flows in a roughly southern direction within a wide basin dotted with lakes. The river basin is fed by rain and snow. Floods are common in the summer period.

Tributaries
The river freezes between the end of October and May.

Flora
The vegetation of the Namana basin is mainly larch taiga, mostly not dense. The snow cover in the river basin lasts between November and April.

See also
List of rivers of Russia

References

External links 
Подлёдная рыбалка. Намана-2019. Небольшой репортаж Fishing in the Namana
Намана-2 (ice fishing in the Namana)
Fishing & Tourism in Yakutia

Rivers of the Sakha Republic